Art of Life 1993.12.31 Tokyo Dome is a live VHS/DVD released by X Japan on September 24, 2003. It claims to contain the band's "Art of Life" performance on December 31, 1993, at the Tokyo Dome as part of the two-day concert series X Japan Returns (both concerts were released on DVD in their entirety in 2008, see X Japan Returns 1993.12.30 and X Japan Returns 1993.12.31). But this name is misleading as it really is an edited mix of both nights. Most of the video was filmed on December 31, but the piano solo part was filmed on December 30. This is the same version that appeared on Art of Life Live five years earlier. Some parts of Toshi's vocals were touched up by studio software to make up for the apparent faults at both live concerts.

A limited edition containing a photobook and a CD containing an "Endless Rain" rehearsal at the studio in Los Angeles was also released the same day.

Track listing
 "Art of Life" – 34:08-10

References

X Japan video albums
2003 video albums
Live video albums
X Japan live albums
2003 live albums
Albums recorded at the Tokyo Dome